The 1980 Cork Intermediate Hurling Championship was the 71st staging of the Cork Intermediate Hurling Championship since its establishment by the Cork County Board in 1909. The draw for the opening round fixtures took place on 3 February 1980. The championship began on 11 May 1980 and ended on 24 August 1980.

On 24 August 1980, Ballyhea won the championship following a 0-15 to 1-10 defeat of Mallow in the final at Fr. Con Buckley Park. This was their third championship title overall and their first title since 1944.

Team changes

To Championship

Promoted from the Cork Junior Hurling Championship
 Tracton

Upgraded from the East Cork Junior A Hurling Championship
 Erin's Own

Results

First round

Second round

Quarter-finals

Semi-finals

Final

References

Cork Intermediate Hurling Championship
Cork Intermediate Hurling Championship